Duties Beyond Borders (full title: Duties Beyond Borders: On the Limits and Possibilities of Ethical International Politics) is a book by Stanley Hoffmann published in 1981 which focuses on the application of ethical principles to international relations. The book won the Le Prix Adolphe Bentinck for 1982 for "the book which most contributes to the unity and cause of peace in Europe". The book is based upon a series of lectures which Hoffmann gave at Syracuse University between February and April 1980.

See also
Cosmopolitanism
Just and Unjust Wars

References

Further reading
Steiner, Miriam (1982) Review: Ethic of Balance, The Review of Politics, 44/3: 440-442
Farer, Tom (1982) Review: Untitled,  The American Journal of International Law, 76/4: 888-895
Nossal, Kim (1982) Duties Beyond Borders: On the Limits and Possibilities of Ethical International Politics Stanley Hoffmann Syracuse, N.Y.: Syracuse University Press, 1981, pp. xic, 252, Canadian Journal of Political Science. 15: 421-422
Hevener, Natalie (1982) Duties Beyond Borders: On the Limits and Possibilities of Ethical International Politics. By Stanley Hoffmann. (Syracuse, NY: Syracuse University Press, 1981. Pp. xiv, 252.'', The Journal of Politics, 44: 901-903
Pogge, Thomas (1986) Review: Liberalism and Global Justice: Hoffmann and Nardin on Morality in International Affairs, Philosophy in Public Affairs, 15/1:67-81

External links
 Le Professeur: From Vichy to Iraq with a widely cultured “citizen of Harvard”, Harvard Magazine

1981 non-fiction books
Ethics books
Books by Stanley Hoffmann
Books about human rights
Books about international relations
Syracuse University Press books